The black-eared mantella (Mantella milotympanum) is a species of frog in the family Mantellidae.
It is endemic to Madagascar.
Its natural habitats are subtropical or tropical moist lowland forests, subtropical or tropical swamps, subtropical or tropical moist montane forests, and swamps. It is threatened by habitat loss. None of its habitat is currently protected (2017).

It is kept as a pet; in the past, it has been collected in large numbers, and the pet trade may be a major threat to the species.

References

Mantella
Endemic frogs of Madagascar
Species endangered by grazing
Species endangered by subsistence agriculture
Species endangered by logging for timber
Species endangered by logging for charcoal
Species endangered by invasive species
Species endangered by deliberate fires
Species endangered by urbanization
Species endangered by the pet trade
Taxonomy articles created by Polbot
Amphibians described in 1996